Elerai is an administrative ward in Arusha District, Arusha Region of Tanzania. It is one of 19 urban administrative wards in the municipality. The ward is bordered by Olasiti ward to the west, Kiranyi ward to the north, Ngarenaro ward to the east, Sombetini to the south and, a tiny portion of Unga L.T.D ward to the southeast. The ward covers an area of 3.746 km2 (1.446 sq mi) and ranks number eleven in the area in Arusha city. The ward is home to the national National College of Tourism, the African Court and Tanzania National Parks Authority (TANAPA)'s national headquarters, also the Arusha Modern school. The school's famous alumna is Tanzanian recording artist, Vanessa Mdee, who received secondary education there. According to the 2012 census, the ward had a total population of 40,749.

Economy 
The ward is also home to TANAPA national headquarters and the famous African Court. Other industries are the Arusha Meat company and the JR Institute of Information Technology. These institutions are the biggest contributors to the Elerai ward economy, supporting the surrounding businesses. The ward is also home to the Elerai Maize Depot which is one of the largest in the city bringing maize from surrounding regions to be sold and distributed. The ward also has some light industries and manufacturing that also support the ward's economy.

Administration and neighborhoods 
The postal code for Elerai Ward is 23106. 
Elerai ward is divided into fourteen neighborhoods: 
 Azimio, Elerai
 Majengo A, Elerai
 Majengo B, Elerai
 Mama Musa, Elerai
 Olmatejoo A, Elerai
 Olmatejoo B, Elerai
 Remtula, Elerai
 Sakon, Elerai
 Shuma, Elerai
 Kware, Elerai
 Ngurumo, Elerai
 Sakina, Elerai
 Samanga, Elerai
 Urundini, Elerai

Education
Elerai ward is home to these educational institutions:
Elerai Secondary School 
Elerai Primary School 
Arusha Modern School (private)
National College of Tourism 
JR Institute of Information technology (private)
St. Michael Primary School
Majengo Primary School

Healthcare
Elerai ward is home to the following health institutions:
Sakina Medical Center (private)
Elerai Health Center
Elerai Dispensary (private)

Note
Not to be confused with a village in Kilindi District in Tanga Region of Tanzania also named Elerai. That village is bordered by Kibirashi village to the north-east.

References 

Wards of Arusha City
Wards of Arusha Region